The ITTF Star Awards are annual awards organized by the International Table Tennis Federation to recognize professional table tennis players and coaches. The awards were established in 2013.

Awards

See also
ITTF World Tour

References

External links
ITTF Star Awards

International Table Tennis Federation
Awards established in 2013
Table tennis awards